Joseph Reynolds "Joie" Ray Jr. (September 29, 1923 – April 13, 2007) was an American open-wheel and stock-car racer.

Ray was born in Louisville, Kentucky. In 1947, Ray was the first African American licensed by the American Automobile Association. Ray raced primarily in the Midwest and raced in AAA, USAC, CSRA and other organizations, but despite many sources to the contrary, was not the first African-American to race in NASCAR's top series.  The Joie Ray who started 25th in the 1952 Daytona race in a Henry J was white, from Portland, Oregon and little is known about him.  They were two different men.

Elias Bowie became the first African-American to race in NASCAR's top series, then known as Grand National, when he raced in the July 31, 1955 event at San Mateo, California.

Ray died in Louisville of pneumonia.

References

External links

 http://www.racerhub.com/forum/archive/index.php/t-11418.html

1923 births
2007 deaths
African-American racing drivers
Burials in Kentucky
Deaths from pneumonia in Kentucky
Racing drivers from Louisville, Kentucky
African-American IndyCar Series drivers
20th-century African-American sportspeople
21st-century African-American people